Danjuma Ademola Kuti (born June 25, 1998) is a Nigerian professional footballer who plays as a forward for Accra Hearts of Oak, a Ghana Premier League Club.

Sources 

 Maradona declares interest in Nigerian striker, Danjuma Ademola
 Nigerian Striker Wanted By Maradona | INNONEWS.COM.NG
 Hearts of Oak complete signing of Niger international Danjuma Kuti
 Hearts of Oak targets six players for second round; Check them - Kickgh.com

External links 
 https://www.ghanaweb.com/GhanaHomePage/SportsArchive/Danjuma-Ademola-Kuti-reveals-he-joined-Hearts-of-Oak-for-good-publicity-918988
 https://www.modernghana.com/sports/993997/hearts-of-oak-seal-transfer-of-nigeria-forward.html
 

Living people
1998 births
Nigerian footballers
Association football forwards
Nigeria Professional Football League players
UAE Pro League players
Lobi Stars F.C. players
Fujairah FC players
Accra Hearts of Oak S.C. players
Nigerian expatriate footballers
Nigerian expatriate sportspeople in the United Arab Emirates
Expatriate footballers in the United Arab Emirates
Nigerian expatriate sportspeople in India
Expatriate footballers in India